EastSouthWestNorth is an English-language China-focused blog written by Roland Soong (宋以朗,)), a Hong Kong-based blogger. The blog combines English translations of Chinese articles, comments and recommended reading. It was started in 2003 when Roland Soong moved back to Hong Kong. Notable subjects include Eileen Chang, J-Pop, and Shanghai World Expo.

Influence
According to a survey conducted by Rebecca MacKinnon in late 2006, EastSouthWestNorth appears to be substantially more important to foreign correspondents than other English-language China-focused blogs.

Media Presence
Roland Soong has been interviewed by BBC News, Next Magazine, OhmyNews, Reuters and The Standard, a free Hong Kong newspaper.

References

External links
 ESWN.info
 EastSouthWestNorth
 Links to press coverage on EastSouthWestNorth
 Profile 13: Roland Soong
 BBC News: Chinese bloggers debate Google
 OhmyNews: Hong Kong Blogger Denies Government Snooping
 Rebecca MacKinnon: Blogs and China correspondence – survey results
 Comme les Chinois: Q&A interview with Roland Soong, May 2008

Chinese blogs